The 2003–04 Florida Gators men's basketball team represented the University of Florida during the 2003–04 men's college basketball season.

Roster

Schedule

References

Florida Gators men's basketball seasons
Florida
Florida